Rigels Qose (born 3 August 1977, in Korçë) is an Albanian former football player who played for Skënderbeu Korçë, Dinamo Tirana, Western Mass Pioneers, Partizani Tirana and Skënderbeu in the USA.

Playing career

Club
After a lengthy career in Albania, Qosa moved to the United States in 2005 to end up in the All League First Team after a season with Western Mass Pioneers for whom he scored 12 in 21 games. He also won a league title with an American amateur side called Skënderbeu.

International
Qosa scored the only goal when Albania beat Portugal 1-0 in Tirana in a UEFA European Under-16 Championship qualifier on 3 March 1993.

Coaching career
Qosa was appointed technical director at Long Island Rough Riders, where he had been working since 2012. He had earlier been working as head coach of Long Island's clubs Royal FC and SUSA.

Honours
Albanian Superliga: 1
 2002

References

1977 births
Living people
Footballers from Korçë
Albanian footballers
Association football forwards
Albania youth international footballers
Albania under-21 international footballers
KF Skënderbeu Korçë players
FK Dinamo Tirana players
Western Mass Pioneers players
FK Partizani Tirana players
Kategoria Superiore players
Albanian expatriate footballers
Expatriate soccer players in the United States
Albanian expatriate sportspeople in the United States